Windermere Lake or Lake Windermere may refer to:

Windermere, the largest natural lake in England
Windermere Lake (British Columbia), a popular recreational lake located on the Columbia River, Canada
Windermere Lake Provincial Park, British Columbia
Windermere Lake (Ontario), a lake located in Ontario, Canada
 Lake Windermere (Illinois), reservoir, Coles County, Illinois, United States 
 Lake Windermere (North Carolina), reservoir, Mecklenburg County, North Carolina, United States 
 Lake Windermere (Tennessee), reservoir, Shelby County, Tennessee, United States

See also
Windermere (disambiguation)